Wierzbna  is a village in the administrative district of Gmina Grodków, within Brzeg County, Opole Voivodeship, in south-western Poland.

The name of the village is of Polish origin and comes from the word wierzba, which means "willow".

References

Wierzbna